The women's doubles event in bowling at the 2022 World Games took place from 9 to 11 July 2022 at the Birmingham–Jefferson Convention Complex in Birmingham, United States.

Competition format
A total of 16 teams entered the competition. They competed in knock-out system.

Results

Competition bracket

References 

Bowling at the 2022 World Games